The Reception and Medical Center (RMC) is a state prison and hospital for men located in Lake Butler, Union County, Florida.  The facility was founded in 1968 as an intake and processing point for all male state prisoners and a secure medical facility.   

As of 2016, the facility can house a maximum of 1,503 prisoners with a range of security levels.  The nearby Reception and Medical Center, West Unit houses another 1,148 and Reception and Medical Center, Work Camp houses 432.   

In April 2015, two correctional officers and a third former officer were charged in a scheme to murder a former inmate, in retaliation for a fight in the RMC the previous year.  All three officers were linked to the Traditional American Knights of the Ku Klux Klan.

Notable inmates
Richard Wershe Jr.

See also
Florida Department of Corrections
List of Florida state prisons

References

Prisons in Florida
Buildings and structures in Union County, Florida
1968 establishments in Florida